The discography of Gnarwolves, a British rock band, consists of two studio albums, one compilation album, four extended plays, one live album, and one single.

Studio albums

Compilation albums 
List of compilation albums

Extended plays 
List of extended plays

Live albums 
List of live albums

Singles 
List of singles, showing year released and album name

References 

Citations

Discographies of British artists